(Hyppolyte) Louis Alexandre Dechet (alternatively, spelled Dechez; Lyon, 20 January 1801 - Lier, 18 October 1830) was a French actor and is regarded the author of the lyrics of the Brabançonne, the Belgian national anthem. His pseudonym was Jenneval, possibly named after the drama Jenneval, ou le Barnevelt français (1769) of Louis Sébastien Mercier.

Dechet worked in Ajaccio, Marseille and in 1826 at the Paris Odéon. Via Lille he finally came to Brussels, where he played at La Monnaie. In 1828 he returned to Paris in order to work at the Comédie Française, but returned to Brussels immediately after the July Revolution in 1830. He there served with the city guard which was responsible for maintaining law and order.

Dechet is said to have written the text of the Brabançonne during the first revolutionary gatherings at the café "L'Aigle d'Or" in the Brussels Greepstraat in August 1830, shortly after the performance of the opera La Muette de Portici, which triggered the Belgian revolution.

During the Belgian Revolution Dechet became a volunteer in the revolutionary army and joined the corps of Frenchman Charles Niellon. He died during a combat against the Dutch near Lier.

On the Place des Martyrs/Martelaarsplein in Brussels, a column honouring Dechet is to be found, which was created by the sculptor Alfred Crick and inaugurated in 1897.

Gallery

External links
 Historical background of the Brabançonne by the Compagnie Royale des Francs Arquebusiers (in French)

1801 births
1830 deaths
Male actors from Lyon
French male stage actors
French poets
People of the Belgian Revolution
Troupe of the Comédie-Française
19th-century French male actors
French expatriates in Belgium
French male poets
19th-century poets
19th-century male writers
National anthem writers